Jules Vanhevel (10 March 1895 in Koekelare – 21 July 1969 in Ostend) was a Belgian racing cyclist. He was a professional from 1919 to 1936.

Biography 

In the literature, his name is often misspelled as "Jules Van Hevel.
The cyclist Jules A. Vanhevel should not be confused with Jules K. Vanhevel, the last miller of the East Mill at Gistel, a relative

Jules Vanhevel his first racing bike was a Bercley.

Record as beginner 

1913
 1st place "The First Step" at Brussels
 1st place Harelbeke-Gent Harelbeke-
 1st place at Tielt

Record as independent 

1914
 1st place coast of Circulation
 3rd place Grand Prix Brussels
 1st place Grand Prix Merkem
 1st place Evergem-Oostende Evergem-
 1st place Grand Prix Franco-Belge

Record in the war / in military service 
Jules Vanhevel served as a cyclist in the 1st Artillery Regiment and later in the trench mortars Van Doren of the 1st Army Division.
He was injured and was sent to England ill.

1917
 Molinari Cup 1st place at Stamford Bridge
1918
 Molinari Cup 1st place at Stamford Bridge
 1st place at Gravelines
1919
 1st place Grand Prix Mechelen

Record as a professional 

1919
 3rd place Tour of Flanders
 (interruption cycling career in the Army in Germany))
 (Statement) Tour of Battlefields Strasbourg-Luxembourg-Brussels-Amiens (2nd in the 1st round, 2nd round and 5th in the list in the 3rd round)
 3rd place Tour of Belgium (2nd in the 1st round, 3rd in the 3rd round, 2nd in the 4th and 6th in the 5th round trip)
 2nd place The Three Sister Cities Bruges Gentbrugge-
 (discharge from military service)
 1st place Championship of Flanders Koolskamp
 1st Place Circuit Veurne-Ambacht
 1st place at Ichtegem
1920
 1st place Tour of Flanders
 5th place Paris–Roubaix
 4th place Milano–Torino-
 (abandon) Tour of Belgium (1st in the 1st round, 10th in the 2nd round and declared in the 3rd round by accident)
 1st place Belgian National Road Race Championships for elite
 1st place Championship of Flanders Koolskamp
 3rd place Six days of New York (with Henri Van Lerberghe)
1921 Team Bianchi Dunlop 
 2nd place Tour of Flanders
 3rd place Tour of Belgium (6th in the 1st round, 1st in the 2nd round, 2nd in the 3rd round, 3rd in the 4th round, 2nd in the 5th round)
 1st place Belgian National Road Race Championships for elite
 2nd place Grand Prix Duffel
 (abandon) Tour of Italy 5th in the 2nd round)
 4th place Six days of New York (by Marcel Buyze)
1922
 1st place Tour of West Flanders
 8th place Six Days of Paris (by Marcel Buyze)
1923 Team Cycles M.Buysse-Colonial 
 4th place Tour of Flanders
 1st Place Circuit Nieuwpoort
 1st place The Three Sister Cities Antwerp-Torhout
 2nd place Schaal Sels
 1st place Den Haag - Arnhem - Den Haag
 1st place at Balgerhoeke
 1st place Grand Prix Brasschaat
 1st place Criterium der Azen
 5th place Belgian National Road Race Championships for elite
 1st place Six Days of Brussels, (with Cesar Debaets)
 9th place Six Days of Paris (with Cesar Debaets)
 11th place Six Days of Ghent (by Marcel Buyze)
1924 Team Wonder-Russel 
 1st place Paris–Roubaix
 1st Place Circuit Paris
 1st place Criterium der Azen
 5th place Tour of Flanders
 3rd place at Blankenberge
 2nd place Six Days of Ghent (with Lucien Buysse)
1925 Team Wonder 
 3rd place Paris–Roubaix
 3rd place Giro della Provincia Milano (with Gerard Debaets) (2nd test on the slopes, on his Australian 2nd, 4th on the road)
 1st place Six Days of Ghent (with Cesar Debaets)
1926 Team Ravat-Wonder-Dunlop and team Opel=Pollack 
 1st Place Circuit du Littoral
 2nd place Berlin-Hanover-Berlin
 2nd place Circuit Stuttgart
 2nd place Circuit Cologne
 3rd place Tour of Frankfurt
 3rd place Championship of Germany
 11th place Circuit of Paris
 27th Paris–Tours
 3rd place Six Days of Berlin (with Emile Aerts)
 4th place Six Days of Brussels (with Denis Verschueren)
1927 Team Opel ZR-III 
 1st place Hanover - Bremen - Hannover
 1st place Berlin - Cottbus - Berlin
 2nd place Tour Frankfurt
 2nd place around Cologne
 2nd place Württemberg Rundfahrt
 1st place at Hulst
1928
 1st place Tour of Belgium (1st in the 1st round, 2nd in the 2nd round, 2nd and 3rd in the 3rd round in 4th ride)
 1st place Omloop der Vlaamse Regions
 2nd place  Sachsen-Tour
 3rd place Six Days of Leipzig (with Oskar Tietz)
 4th place Six Days of Brussels (by Jules Verschelden)
 6th place Paris–Roubaix
 (abandon) World''( "But? ... It happened at Km. 80. Ronsse was in the lead. Van Hevel at his wheel. Before them, a harnessing of oxen. One of the animals and turn away again with -tail. Ronsse the lead, running alongside a rake ment. He comes over. Jules follows. At 'the moment he passes, the tail stutters — read carefully, dear reader — from the ox to the brake handle on the handlebar, with the result that Van Hevel as mercilessly as the substance is suddenly thrown. He was hurt, hands and legs, and the whole body. ")" "
1929
 3rd place Six Days of Dortmund (with Rene Vermandel)
1930
 1st place at Gistel
1931
 1st place at Avelgem
 8th place World
 2nd place Six Days of Brussels (with Piet Van Kempen)
 9th place Six Days of Berlin (with Jean Van Buggenhout)
1932
 1st place at Niel
 4th place Six Days of Brussels (with Leopold Haegelsteen)
1933
 6th place Six Days of Brussels (with Gustaaf Van Slembrouck)
1936
 6th place Six Days of Brussels (with Kees Pellenaars)

Museum 
In the ancient hostelry 'De Engel' at Ichtegem, of the family Maeckelbergh, one can admire a unique collection of Jules Vanhevel. Robert Maeckelbergh was the caretaker of Jules Vanhevel and married his sister Lea.

References

Further reading 
 Het rijke Vlaamsche wielerleven, Karel Van Wijnendaele

External links 
 OPEL Fahrräder''''

1895 births
1969 deaths
Belgian male cyclists
People from Koekelare
Cyclists from West Flanders
Belgian track cyclists